Barton Williams (born September 20, 1956 in Mare Island, California) is an American former hurdler. He attended California Polytechnic State University (Cal Poly-San Luis Obispo) from 1975–1979. Williams is one of Cal Poly's all-time greatest track and field athletes.

Career
Barton Williams is a member of the U.S. Track & Field and Cross Country Coaches Association NCAA Division II Track & Field Athlete Hall of Fame.  
Bart Williams represented the U.S. in 10 international competitions, held several CAL POLY School records, including one NCAA Division II 400IH record. He also was recipient of the 2005 Distinguished alumnus Cal Poly Track & Field Award and California State Assembly Resolution Award For Outstanding Athlete 1979. Williams was the cross country running coach at Vallejo High School in Vallejo, California. He has coached track at Contra Costa College in Richmond, CA.

In 1979, Bart was one of only a few athletes to be All American in both NCAA Division I & II track and field events. Barton Williams was the first athlete from Vallejo, CA to participate on an Olympic Team. when he qualified for the 1980 U.S. Olympic team.  He was unable to compete due to President Jimmy Carter's decision to boycott the 1980 Olympic Games in Moscow, U.S.S.R., because the Soviet Union had invaded Afghanistan in December 1979. Barton Williams was an assistant coach for the U.S. World University Games team in China, in 2001. He coached the men's hurdles and the horizontal jumps. In 2007, he received one of 461 Congressional Gold Medals created especially for the spurned athletes.

Achievements

 Cal Poly Sport Hall of Fame: Inducted Oct 1998
 Cal Poly Cross Country and Track & Field Hall of Fame : Inducted January 12, 1991
 World & US Ranking from 1979, 1980, 1981, 1984, 1987– Highest world Ranking 6th
 Qualified for USA Olympic Team 1980
 NCAA All American Ten times: 1976–1979
 West Coast Relay College Most Outstanding Athletes 1979 Fresno, CA
 Cal Poly Most Valuable- Barton Williams, Dan Aldridge, Jim Schankle 1979
 Cal Poly Most Valuable- Barton Williams, Jim Schankle 1978

School records
 Cal Poly-San Luis Obispo school records Holder in the 400 meter hurdles
 400m – 4 × 100 m relay – 4 × 400 m relay – 4 × 200 m relay – distance medley relay
 CCAA conference records Holder in the 400m, 200m, 4X100 RELAY, 4X400 RELAY, 1978
 CCAA conference champion 400m, 200m 4x100 relay, 4x400 relay 1978& 1979
 NCAA Division II champion and former recorder holder 400 meter hurdles, 1979
 NCAA Division II champion, 4x100 relay 1979

USA teams
 USA & Great Britain duel meet Team 1981 London, England
 Pacific Conference Games 1981 Auckland, New Zealand
 United States Olympic Team Member, 1980, 400IH Boycott Moscow, U.S.S.R.
 Eight Nation Games 1979& 1980 Tokyo, Japan
 Pan- American Games Team Member 1979 San Juan, Puerto Rico
 Sparakiad Games 1979 Moscow, Russia
 World University Games Team Member 1979 Mexico City, Mexico
 PRE – Commonwealth Games Trial 1978 Edmonton, Canada
 Sport Festival West Team 1978 Colorado Springs, Colorado

References

American male hurdlers
Sportspeople from Vallejo, California
Olympic track and field athletes of the United States
California Polytechnic State University alumni
1956 births
Living people
Congressional Gold Medal recipients